Satkania is an upazila of Chattogram District in Chattogram Division, Bangladesh.

Geography
Satkania has a total area of 280.99 km2.

It is bounded by Chandanaish Upazila on the north, Lohagara Upazila on the south, Bandarban Sadar upazila on the east, Banshkhali and Anwara Upazilas on the west. Main river is Sangu, Dalu & Hangor; Main depressions are Goribarjheel, Mahalia.

Demographics

According to the 2011 Bangladesh census, Satkania Upazila had 70,808 households and a population of 384,806, 14.1% of whom lived in urban areas. 12.0% of the population was under the age of 5. The literacy rate (age 7 and over) was 52.7%, compared to the national average of 51.8%.

Points of interest

 Sangu River
 Katakhali Lake
 Baitul Izzat Area
 Baitarani-Shilghata Forest Area by the river Sangu
 Razar Pahar Charati
 Shahi Eid Gah of Churamani
 Charati and pukuria Belgao Tea Garden
 Amilaish Bill and Charanchal
 Mahaliya Bill (Natural Lake)
 Satyapirer dargah (Baitul Ijjat)
 Forestry area of churamani
 Prantik Lake Holodia
 Thakur Dighi
 Daroga Mosque
 Jangli Pir Mazar,  Kanchana
 Ahzgor Shah Ara (Mazar), Sairtali, Sonakania Union
 Al-Monsur Jame Masjid, ChamdarPara, nazu seth barri
 Basar-Mar Pokur, ChhamdarPara, nazu seth barri
 Play ground of Mokkar Boli Khela, Madarsha.
 Dowlat shah Mosjid (DowlatShah para) Alinagor
 Mirzakhil Darbar Sharif
 Sonakania Manziler Dargah
 Kazi Bari Jame Masjid, Kanchana

Administration
Satkania thana was established in 1917 and was turned into an upazila in 1983.

Satkania Upazila is divided into Satkania Municipality and 17 union parishads: Amilaisi, Bazalia, Charati, Dharmapur, Dhemsa, Eochia, Kaliais, Kanchana, Keochia, Khagaria, Madarsha, Nalua, Paschim Dhemsa, Purangor, Sadaha, Satkania, and Sonakania. The union parishads are subdivided into 73 mauzas and 84 villages.

Satkania Municipality is subdivided into 9 wards and 19 mahallas.

Educational institution
There are many educational institution. Some of these are:
 Satkania Government College
 Satkania Adarsha Mohila College
 Al Helal Adarsha Degree College
 North Satkania Jafor Ahmed Chowdhury College
 Satkania Model High School
 Mirzakhil High School

Notable residents
 Afzal Ali, medieval poet. 
 Abul Fazal, writer and former vice-chancellor of Chittagong University
 Abu Reza Muhammad Nezamuddin - Bangladeshi politician. 
 Abul Momen -Ekushey Padak recipient Bangladeshi journalist and writer.
 A F M Khalid Hossain - Islamic scholar, researcher and writer.
 Alamgir Muhammad Serajuddin - Ekushey Padak recipient Bangladeshi academic. 
 Abu Saleh - Bangladeshi politician and former MNA  
 Dr B M Faizur Rahman - Bangladeshi politician and freedom fighter         
 Bimal Guha (born 1952), poet
 Ibrahim Bin Khalil - Bangladeshi politician and freedom fighter.
 M. Siddique - Bangladeshi politician and freedom fighter.
 Samsul Islam - Bangladeshi politician
 Shahjahan Chowdhury - Bangladeshi politician.  
 Sukomal Barua - Ekushey Padak Bangladeshi academic.

See also
 Upazilas of Bangladesh
 Districts of Bangladesh
 Divisions of Bangladesh

References